McSkimming is a surname. Notable people with the surname include:

Bob McSkimming (1864–1924) Scottish footballer
Bobby McSkimming (born 1956), Scottish footballer
David McSkimming, Australian accompanists and regular performer in concert and on radio
Dent McSkimming (1896–1976), American sportswriter for several St. Louis newspapers
Geoffrey McSkimming (born 1962), children's novelist and poet
Peter McSkimming (1872–1941), Independent Member of Parliament for Clutha, in the South Island of New Zealand
Robert McSkimming (footballer, born 1885) (1885–1952), Scottish footballer for Albion Rovers, Sheffield Wednesday, Motherwell 
Shaun McSkimming (born 1970), Scottish former footballer who played as a midfielder
Warren McSkimming (born 1979), member of the Otago cricket team

See also 
Masking (disambiguation)
Mucking